Journey is the debut studio album by American rock band Journey. It was released on April 1, 1975 by Columbia Records. Unlike their later recordings, this is a jazzy progressive rock album which focuses mainly on the band's instrumental talents. It is the only album to include rhythm guitarist George Tickner among their lineup.

Journey recorded a demo album prior to the release of Journey, with the same songs in different order and with Prairie Prince as the drummer. There were additional tracks, including instrumental pieces, that did not make it to the final product, including the original title track of the demo album, "Charge of the Light Brigade".

Track listing

Personnel
Journey
 Gregg Rolie – lead vocals, keyboards
 Neal Schon – lead guitar, vocals
 George Tickner – rhythm guitar
 Ross Valory – bass, piano, vocals
 Aynsley Dunbar – drums

Production
Roy Halee – producer, engineer
 Mark Friedman – recording
 George Horn – mastering at CBS Studios, San Francisco
 Nancy Donald – art direction
 Steven Silverstein – photography
 Richard Swanson – production management

Charts

See also 
 Comet Kohoutek

References

External links 
 Journey - Journey (1975) album review by Stephen Thomas Erlewine, credits and releases at AllMusic.com
 Journey - Journey (1975) album releases & credits at Discogs.com
 Journey - Journey (1975) album to be listened as stream at Play.Spotify.com

Journey (band) albums
1975 debut albums
Columbia Records albums
Albums produced by Roy Halee